Crowle Peatland Railway is a fledgling railway museum based on the peat moors at Crowle in North Lincolnshire, England.

History

Background
Thorne and Hatfield Moors have a long history of being exploited for peat. Following Cornelius Vermuyden's attempts to drain Hatfield Chase in the 1620s, there was unrest, with local people clashing with the incoming people who settled the land that had been drained. A Commission was created to resolve issues over common land, and in 1630 gave 'turbary rights' to tenants, which allowed them to cut peat for their own purposes, but not to sell peat to third parties. There were attempts in the early 1800s to improve the moors for agricultural use, but by the time Makin Durham, one of the chief protagonists, died in 1882, there was a shift towards extracting peat for commercial purposes. In 1896 the Hatfield Chase Peat Moss Litter Company amalgamated with the Griendtsveen Moss Litter Company and other smaller companies who were working on Thorne Moors, to become the British Moss Litter Company. The new company controlled all of the major peat works on the moors, and began installing  gauge tramways, to transport the cut peat from the moors to the various works. In the 1950s, horses were gradually replaced by locomotives as the means of moving wagons around the system. As several works closed down, the tramways were linked up, with that at Swinefleet serving Thorne Moors, and that at Hatfield serving Hatfield Moors. Both works were linked by standard gauge sidings to the Axholme Joint Railway. The British Moss Litter Company was bought out by Fisons in February 1963, Fisons were the subject of a management buyout in July 1994, and began trading as Levington Horticulture, which was taken over by the American company Scotts on 1 January 1998.

Crowle Moor is effectively an eastward extension of Thorne Moor. This anomaly was noted by the Local Government Act 1888, which moved the county boundary so that the Crowle turbary land was included in Lincolnshire. Peat exploitation to the east of the Swinefleet Warping Drain was always on a smaller scale than on Thorne Moors to the west of the drain, and in 1993 the boundary was realigned slightly, so that it followed the course of the drain. Over the years there were several small peat moss mills established in Crowle, all near to Moor Middle Road, and each working a ribbon of moorland which ran north-westwards from the mill to the parish boundary. The British Moss Litter Company also extracted peat from Crowle Moors, taking it to Medge Hall and Swinefleet Works, but this ceased in 1956 after a disastrous fire on the moors.

The longest-running site on Crowle Moor was that based at Moors Farm, where horses pulled wagons loaded with hand-cut turves along a single tramway track to a mill. The farm was bought by Clifford Cowling in 1940, who initially used the  site for agriculture, but in 1947 set up the Scientific Peat Company with William Thomas. Turves were conveyed to the mill on a trailer pulled by a Fordson Major tractor, although a short section of tramway was used on the moors between 1954 and 1957. A diesel engine replaced the paraffin engine which powered the mill in 1955, and the mill was connected to an electricity supply in 1957.  The peat was processed for horticultural use, and the firm pioneered the use of polythene packaging on Thorne Moors. Consequently, the company was renamed in 1960, becoming Poly-Peat Products. The mill was subsequently used by Ken Crow Peat Products, Richgro Peat, and finally Fernmoor UK Limited, which was incorporated in 2002, and was the last peat company to be formed.

The Trust bought  in 1987, which included the area they had been managing since 1971. Fisons gave  of moorland to English Nature in 1994, in a climate where there was relentless pressure from environmentalists to recognise the ecological value of the moors. This culminated in the government buying the peat extraction rights for Thorne and Hatfield Moors from Scotts in 2002 for £17 million. On most of the moors, no further extraction of peat occurred, although cut peat continued to be removed by Scotts until 2005. The peat works at Crowle, then run by Fernmoor, was known to be operating without planning permission, and the North Lincolnshire Council (Crowle) Discontinuance Order 2002 sought to shut down the operation. Peat extraction continued, despite the issuing of an Enforcement Notice and a Stop Notice in March 2003, and it was not until 2007 that peat extraction finally ceased after a long-running public enquiry published its findings. Fernmoor was wound up on 25 September 2007.

Railway project
Following the demise of commercial activity on Crowle and Thorne Moors, they became part of the Humberhead National Nature Reserve. The tramway tracks were removed, but various equipment was left at Bank Top, including one of the Simplex locomotives and some bin harvesters. A society was formed, initially called the Crowle and Thorne Moors Peat Railway Society, with the aim of restoring the locomotive, and using the maintenance shed at Bank Top as a base for a short running track. It would also serve to promote the history and heritage of the peat railways. However, the scheme did not meet with the approval of Natural England, although they were supportive of the aims of the society, and donated the locomotive and bin harvesters to them. They were removed from the moors in 2015, and temporarily stored on a local farm.

In 2014, the Society discovered that two of the original Schoma locomotives that had worked on the moors were for sale by a dealer based in Norfolk. Two visits were made to inspect them, the second on 16 February 2015, after which a price was agreed, although the locomotives, together with three slave units, remained at the premises of the dealer Ray King until a suitable location could be found to store them. The Poly-Peat site was now owned by North Lincolnshire Council, and became the base for the operation, while the Society was renamed Crowle Peatland Railway. They received funding of £10,000 from North Lincolnshire Council and the Isle of Axholme and Hatfield Chase Landscape Partnership to fund the restoration of the locomotives. The Partnership obtained a grant of £1.84 million from the Heritage Lottery Fund, which benefitted a number of local projects, including the railway. The Schoma locomotives were moved from Norfolk to a Romney hut, also used as covered accommodation for a herd of goats, on 10 May 2016, and were subsequently joined by the Simplex. The Society then received a grant of £23,000 from the SSE Keadby Grange Windfarm, to finance the construction of a new Romney hut, to act as a workshop for the project Planning permission for the building was granted on 30 June 2017 and the Schoma locomotives were moved into the completed building on 5 September 2018. Meanwhile, the Simplex locomotive was moved to North Lindsey College, for engineering students to carry out the restoration work as part of their course.

As of May 2019, there was no electricity supply to the Romney hut. The supply company Northern Powergrid (Yorkshire) acting on behalf of North Lincolnshire Council applied for permission to rebuild 9 spans of an existing overhead 11kV power line supplying adjacent housing, on 7 May 2019. This will provide a 3-phase supply at 150kva,  to power workshop machinery. In June 2019, the railway received £107,000 from North Lincolnshire Council, to fund a visitor centre, education facilities, a shop, toilets and a cafe. Crowle Moors are part of a Site of Special Scientific Interest (SSSI), and the visitor centre will help people to appreciate the social and industrial heritage of the moors.

Locomotives
Between 1947 and the demise of commercial working, 23 internal combustion locomotives worked on the moors. All were 4-wheel vehicles, and they came from a variety of manufacturers. Nine locomotives were bought for preservation between 1992 and the close of the system. One locomotive was abandoned at Bank Top around 1996, and it was this that sparked the idea for the railway. It was a  Simplex, manufactured by Motor Rail in 1967, with the works number 40s302, and bought new by Fisons. When new, it had a fairly low cab, but a number of locomotives had their cabs extended upwards, to allow the drivers to stand up and see over the top of the wagons, and 40s302 was running with an extended cab and exhaust pipe by May 1992. During restoration at North Lindsey College, the main bearing journals were found to be completely worn out, which was probably the reason for it being abandoned on the moors.

In 1990, Fisons bought two new Schoma locomotives from Christoph Schőttler Gmbh, of Diepholz in Germany. They were rather bigger than previous motive power, weighing around 5 tonnes and were fitted with engines developing . They were 4-wheel diesel hydraulic machines, and each was supplied with a slave unit, looking like a flat truck, which weighed a similar amount and had hydraulic motors which could be driven from the locomotive. Works numbers were 5129 and 5130, with the slave units numbered 5131 and 5132. The following year, Fisons bought a third locomotive, number 5220 with slave unit 5221. From February 1993, this locomotive was named The Thomas Buck, after a retired worker, with the nameplate fitted to the front of the bonnet. In the late 1990s, Alan Keef designed a  bo-bo locomotive to replace them, but the project did not proceed due to the costs, and instead, two of the locomotives were rebuilt with 6-cylinder  engines and better air conditioning units. Conversion of the third locomotive, number 5220, did not occur, again because of costs. After rail operations ceased on the moors, 5130 was mounted on a plinth at the front of Hatfield Works, with the nameplate from The Thomas Buck, and the other two locomotives were stored at Hatfield until at least 2008.

The two remaining Schomas and all three slave units eventually arrived at Ray King's site in Norfolk, to be purchased by Crowle Peatland Railway and moved to Crowle on 10 May 2016. The third Schoma locomotive was donated to the railway by Evergreen Horticulture, who manage Hatfield Peat Works, in June 2019.

Bibliography

References

Heritage railways in Lincolnshire
3 ft gauge railways in England
Museums in Lincolnshire
Railway museums in England